The following tables compare general and technical information for a number of office suites:

General information 
Office Suite names that are on a light purple background are discontinued.

OS support 
The operating systems the office suites were designed to run on without emulation; for the given office suite/OS combination, there are five possibilities:
 No indicates that it does not exist or was never released.
 Partial indicates that while the office suite works, it lacks important functionality compared to versions for other OSs; it is still being developed however.
 Beta indicates that while a version of the office suite is fully functional and has been released, it is still in development (e.g. for stability).
 Yes indicates that the office suite has been officially released in a fully functional, stable version.
 Dropped indicates that while the office suite works, new versions are no longer being released for the indicated OS; the number in parentheses is the last known stable version which was officially released for that OS.
Office Suite names that are on a light purple background are discontinued.

Supported file formats 
Office Suite names that are on a light purple background are discontinued.

Main components 
Office Suite names that are on a light purple background are discontinued.

Online capabilities 
Office Suite names that are on a light purple background are discontinued.

See also 
 List of office suites
 Mobile Office Suites
 Comparison of word processors
 Comparison of spreadsheet software

Notes

References 

Office suites